Dorothea Zucker-Franklin (August 9, 1929 – November 24, 2015) was a physician and medical researcher in the fields of hematology, immunology and cell biology. Born in Berlin, Germany, she fled to Amsterdam with her family in 1936 to escape the Nazi regime. In 1948, the family emigrated to New York, where Zucker-Franklin attended Hunter College for her undergraduate education and earned a medical degree from New York Medical College. Following her internship and residency, she trained in electron microscopy, and would become well-known for her use of this technique to study blood cells. She began teaching at the New York University School of Medicine in 1963 and became a full professor in 1974. She was a member of the National Academy of Medicine and a fellow of the American Academy of Arts and Sciences, and served as president of the Society for Leukocyte Biology in 1985 and the American Society of Hematology in 1995.

Early life and education
Zucker-Franklin was born into a Jewish family on August 9, 1929, in Berlin, Germany. Her parents were Julius Zucker, a merchant, and Gertrude Zucker (née Feige), a Prussian-born musician. In the wake of the Nazi Party's rise to power, the family fled to Amsterdam in 1936. Zucker-Franklin attended secondary school there and was a classmate of Anne Frank. In 1943, during the German occupation of the Netherlands, Zucker-Franklin was captured and interned in a camp; after their release, the family spent the next few years in hiding. During this time, Zucker-Franklin developed a friendship with a boy with type 1 diabetes, which sparked her interest in medicine. In 1948 the family fled to the United States, settling in New York. Zucker-Franklin entered Hunter College and graduated with a bachelor's degree in language in 1952. She went on to pursue a medical degree at New York Medical College, graduating in 1956.

In April 1943, shortly before going into hiding with her family in Nazi-occupied Amsterdam, she had her photograph taken by Annemie Wolff.

Career
Zucker-Franklin completed her internship at Philadelphia General Hospital and her residency at Montefiore Hospital. During residency she developed an interest in hematology, and carried out studies on coagulation factors and lymphocyte immunology. Later she studied electron microscopy at New York University. The use of electron microscopy to study blood cells would become a central theme of her research. Through this technique she worked to elucidate the mechanisms of phagocytosis and the structure and function of white blood cells, platelets and megakaryocytes. Zucker-Franklin also collaborated with her husband, Edward C. Franklin, in studies on amyloid protein. 

In 1963, Zucker-Franklin began working as an assistant professor at the New York University School of Medicine. She became full professor in 1974. In 1981, Zucker-Franklin served as president of the Society for Leukocyte Biology. That year she published the first edition of Atlas of Blood Cells: Function and Pathology in collaboration with Carlo Grossi; the textbook, extensively illustrated with electron micrographs, has been called "the finest in its class". In 1995, Zucker-Franklin was elected president of the American Society of Hematology and became a member of the National Academy of Medicine. She was awarded an honorary PhD by the City University of New York in 1996 and was made a fellow of the American Academy of Arts and Sciences in 2001.

Personal life and death
In 1956, Zucker-Franklin married Edward C. Franklin, who was then a medical researcher at the Rockefeller Institute. Zucker-Franklin had been friends with Edward during her childhood in Berlin. The couple had a daughter in 1964. They owned a farm together, enjoyed collecting sculptures, and collaborated on medical research until Franklin's death in 1982. On November 24, 2015, Zucker-Franklin died at her home in Manhattan, New York.

Selected publications

Articles

Books

Notes

References

1929 births
2015 deaths
Hunter College alumni
New York Medical College alumni
New York University Grossman School of Medicine faculty
Scientists from Berlin
Fellows of the American Academy of Arts and Sciences
Members of the National Academy of Medicine
American hematologists
Women hematologists
Presidents of the American Society of Hematology